The Principia Astronomical Observatory is an observatory located on the campus of Principia College, in Elsah, Illinois, United States. The observatory was installed on June 18, 1998.  It features a 16 inch mirror and is of a Ritchey-Chretien design.  The objective focal length of the telescope is 4000 mm.  The control software is by the Telescope Control System written by Dave Harvey of Comsoft Software (of Tucson, AZ).  The mirror was ground and certified by Don Loomis, former chief optician at Kitt Peak National Laboratories.  The telescope was manufactured by Optomechanics Research.

See also 
List of astronomical observatories

References

External links
Clear Sky Clock Forecasts of observing conditions covering Principia Astronomical Observatory.
Official website of the Principia Astronomical Observatory
Principia Observatory Flickr Page

Astronomical observatories in Illinois
Buildings and structures in Jersey County, Illinois
Principia College